The Gila monster (Heloderma suspectum) is a species of venomous lizard native to the Southwestern United States and the northwestern Mexican state of Sonora. Its venomous close relatives, the four beaded lizards (all former subspecies of Heloderma horridum) inhabit Mexico and Guatemala. The Gila monster is sluggish in nature, so it is not generally dangerous and very rarely poses a real threat to humans. However, it has a fearsome reputation and is sometimes killed in spite of the species being protected by state law in Arizona.

History 

The name "Gila" refers to the Gila River Basin in the U.S. states of Arizona and New Mexico, where the Gila monster was once plentiful. Suspectum comes from the describer, paleontologist Edward Drinker Cope. At first, this new specimen of Heloderma was misidentified and considered to be a northern variation of the beaded lizard already known to live in Mexico. He suspected that the lizard might be venomous due to the grooves in the teeth.

The Gila monster is the largest extant lizard species native to North America north of the Mexican border. The tail is about 20% of the body size, and the largest specimens may reach  in total length. They appear strong in their body structure with a stout snout, massive head, and "little"-appearing eyes, which can be protected by a nictitating membrane.

The Gila monster has four close living relatives, all of which are beaded lizards. There are three species in Mexico: Heloderma exasperatum, Heloderma horridum and Heloderma alvarezi, as well as another species in Guatemala: Heloderma charlesbogerti.

The evolutionary history of the Helodermatidae may be traced back to the Cretaceous period (145 to 166 million years ago), when Gobiderma pulchrum and Estesia mongolensis were present. The genus Heloderma has existed since the Miocene, when H. texana lived. Fragments of osteoderms from the Gila monster have been found in Late Pleistocene (10,000 to 8,000 years ago) deposits near Las Vegas, Nevada. Because the helodermatids have remained relatively unchanged morphologically, they are occasionally regarded as living fossils. Although the Gila monster appears closely related to the monitor lizards (varanids) of Africa, Asia, and Australia, their wide geographical separation and distinct features indicate that Heloderma is better placed in a separate family.

Skin 

The scales of the head, back, and tail contain little pearl-shaped bones (osteoderms) similar to those found in the beaded lizards from further south. The scales of the belly are free from osteoderms. Female Gila monsters go through a total shed lasting about 2 weeks before depositing their eggs. The dorsal part is often shed in one large piece. Adult males normally shed in smaller segments in August. The young seem to be in constant shed. Adults have more or less yellow to pink colors on a black surface. Hatchlings have a uniform, simple, and less colorful pattern. This drastically changes within the first 6 months of their lives. Hatchlings from the northern area of the species' distribution have a tendency to retain most of their juvenile pattern.

The heads of males are very often larger and more triangular-shaped than in females. The length of the tail of the two sexes is statistically very similar, so it does not help in differentiation of the sexes. Individuals with stout tail ends occur in both nature and under human breeding.

Distribution and habitat 

The Gila monster is found in the Southwestern United States and Mexico, a range including Sonora, Arizona, parts of California, Nevada, Utah, and New Mexico. No records have been given from Baja California. They inhabit scrubland, succulent desert, and oak woodland, seeking shelter in burrows, thickets, and under rocks in locations with a favorable microclimate and adequate humidity. Gila monsters depend on water resources and can be observed in puddles of water after a summer rain. They avoid living in open areas, such as flats and open grasslands.

Ecology 

Gila monsters spend 90% of their lifetime underground in burrows or rocky shelters. They are active in the morning during the dry season (spring and early summer). The lizards move to different shelters every 4–5 days up to the beginning of the summer season. By doing so, they optimize for a suitable microhabitat. Later in the summer, they may be active on warm nights or after a thunderstorm. One study investigating a population of Gila monsters in southwestern Utah noted that the lizard's activity peaked from late April to mid June. During the Gila monster's active season of approximately 90 days, only ten days were spent active. Gila monsters are slow sprinters, but they have relatively high endurance and maximal aerobic capacity (VO2 max) compared to other lizards. They are preyed upon by coyotes, badgers and raptors. Hatchlings are preyed on by snakes, such as kingsnakes (Lampropeltis sp.).

Diet 
The Gila monster's diet consists of a variety of food items – small mammals (such as young rabbits, hares, mice, ground squirrels, and other rodents), small birds, snakes, lizards, frogs, insects, other invertebrates, carrion, and the eggs of birds, lizards, snakes, and tortoises. Three to four extensive meals in spring are claimed to give them enough energy for a whole season. Nevertheless, they feed whenever they come across suitable prey. Young Gila monsters can swallow up to 50% of their body weight in a single meal. Adults may eat up to one third of their body weight in one meal.

The Gila monster uses its extremely acute sense of smell to locate prey. The strong, two-ended tipped tongue, which is pigmented in black-blue colors, picks up scent molecules to be transferred to the opening of the Jacobson organ around the middle of the upper mouth cavern.

Prey may be crushed to death if large, or eaten alive, most of the time head first, and helped down by muscular contractions and neck flexing. After food has been swallowed, the Gila monster may immediately resume tongue flicking and search behavior for identifying more prey such as eggs or young in nests. Gila monsters are able to climb trees, cacti, and even fairly straight, rough-surfaced walls.

Venom

Pioneer beliefs 
In the Old West, the pioneers believed a number of myths about the Gila monster, including that the lizard had foul or toxic breath and that its bite was fatal. The Tombstone Epitaph of Tombstone, Arizona, wrote about a Gila monster that a local person caught on May 14, 1881:

On May 8, 1890, southeast of Tucson, Arizona Territory, Empire Ranch owner Walter Vail captured and thought he had killed a Gila monster. He tied it to his saddle and it bit the middle finger of his right hand and would not let go. A ranch hand pried open the lizard's mouth with a pocket knife, cut open his finger to stimulate bleeding, and then tied saddle strings around his finger and wrist. They summoned Dr. John C. Handy of Tucson, who took Vail back to Tucson for treatment, but Vail experienced swollen and bleeding glands in his throat for sometime afterward.

Dr. Handy's friend, Dr. George Goodfellow of Tombstone, was among the first to research the actual effects of Gila monster venom. Scientific American reported in 1890, "The breath is very fetid, and its odor can be detected at some little distance from the lizard. It is supposed that this is one way in which the monster catches the insects and small animals which form a part of its food supplythe foul gas overcoming them." Goodfellow offered to pay local residents $5.00 for Gila monster specimens. He bought several and collected more on his own. In 1891, he purposely provoked one of his captive lizards into biting him on his finger. The bite made him ill and he spent the next five days in bed, but he completely recovered. When Scientific American ran another ill-founded report on the lizard's ability to kill people, he wrote in reply and described his own studies and personal experience. He wrote that he knew several people who had been bitten by Gila monsters, but had not died from the bite.

Venom delivery 

The Gila monster produces venom in modified salivary glands at the end of its lower jaws, unlike snakes, whose venom is produced in glands behind the eyes. The Gila monster lacks strong musculature in glands above the eyes; instead, in Heloderma, the venom is propelled from the gland via a tubing to the base of the lower teeth and then by capillary forces into two grooves of the tooth and then chewed into the victim. The teeth are tightly anchored to the jaw (pleurodont). Broken and regular replacement teeth have to wait every time to go into position in a determinate "wavelike" sequence. They change/replace their teeth during their entire life. The Gila monster's bright colors might be suitable to teach predators not to bother this "painful" creature. Because the Gila monster's prey consists mainly of eggs, small animals, and otherwise "helpless" prey, the Gila monster's venom is thought to have evolved for defensive rather than for hunting use.

Toxicity 
The venom of a Gila monster is normally not fatal to healthy adult humans. No reports of fatalities have been confirmed after 1930, and the rare fatalities recorded before that time occurred in adults who were intoxicated by alcohol or had mismanaged the treatment of the bite. The Gila monster can bite quickly, and may not release the victim without intervention. If bitten, the victim may attempt to fully submerge the lizard in water, pry the jaws open with a knife or stick, or physically yank the lizard free. While pulling the lizard directly increases risk of severe lacerations from the lizard's sharp teeth, it may also mitigate envenomation. Symptoms of the bite include excruciating pain, edema, and weakness associated with a rapid drop in blood pressure.

YouTuber and wildlife educator Coyote Peterson described the bite as "like hot lava coursing through your veins" and claimed it was "the worst pain [he] had ever experienced." It is generally regarded as the most painful venom produced by any vertebrate.

More than a dozen peptides and other substances have been isolated from the Gila monster's venom, including hyaluronidase, serotonin, phospholipase A2, and several kallikrein-like glycoproteins responsible for the pain and edema caused by a bite, without producing a compartment syndrome. Four potentially lethal toxins have been isolated from the Gila monster's venom, which cause hemorrhage in internal organs and exophthalmos (bulging of the eyes), and helothermine, which causes lethargy, partial paralysis of the limbs, and hypothermia in rats. Some are similar in action of the vasoactive intestinal peptide (VIP), which relaxes smooth muscle and regulates water and electrolyte secretion between the small and large intestines. These bioactive peptides are able to bind to VIP receptors in many different human tissues. One of these, helodermin, has been shown to inhibit the growth of lung cancer.

Toxins and drug research 
The constituents of H. suspectum venom that have received the most attention from researchers are the bioactive peptides, including helodermin, helospectin, exendin-3, and exendin-4. Exendin-4, which is specific for H. suspectum, has formed the basis of a class of medications for the treatment of type 2 diabetes, known as Glucagon-like peptide-1 agonists.

In 2005, the U.S. Food and Drug Administration approved the drug exenatide (marketed as Byetta) for the management of type 2 diabetes. It is an extravagantly synthetic blueprint of the protein exendin-4, isolated from the Gila monster's venom. In a 3-year study with people with type 2 diabetes, exenatide showed healthy sustained glucose levels. The effectiveness is because the lizard protein is 53% identical to glucagon-like peptide-1 analog (GLP-1), a hormone released from the human digestive tract that helps to regulate insulin and glucagon. Using a sophisticated injection formula with sustained release of the drug, the lizard protein remains effective much longer than the human hormone. This helps diabetics keep their blood glucose levels under control for a week by a single injection. Exenatide also slows the emptying of the stomach and causes a decrease in appetite, contributing to weight loss.

The antidiabetic exenatide (Byetta®) from the venomous Gila monster is also an example of a medical value of venom peptides, targeting G protein-coupled receptors (GPCRs).

Lifecycle 
The Gila monster emerges from brumation in early March. Gila monsters sexually matures at 4–5 years old. It mates in April and May. The male initiates courtship by flicking his tongue to search for the female's scent. If the female rejects his advances, she will bite him and chase him away. When successful, copulation has been observed in captivity to last from 15 minutes to two and a half hours. There is only a single record of attempted mating outside of a shelter. The female lays eggs at the end of May into June. A clutch may consist of up to six (rarely up to eight) eggs. The incubation in captivity lasts about 5 months, depending on the incubation temperature.

The egg development and hatching time of young in the wild has been a subject of ongoing speculation. The first model stated that youngsters hatch in fall and stay underground. The second theory postulated a nearly developed embryo remains inside the egg over winter and hatches in spring. Hatchlings (weight about ) are observed at the end of April to early June.

Discussions of the exact egg development and hatching cycle of the Gila monster came to an abrupt and unexpected end on October 28, 2016, when a backhoe was digging at the outer walls of a house in a suburb of northern Tucson. The backhoe extracted a nest of a female Gila monster with five eggs in the process of hatching. The Gila monster is now known to hatch near the end of October and immediately proceed into hibernation without surfacing. They then appear on the surface from May through June the following year when prey should be abundant.

In summer, Gila monsters gradually spend less time on the surface to avoid the hottest part of the season; occasionally, they may be active at night. Females that have laid eggs are exhausted and thin, fighting for survival, and have to spend extra effort to "reconstitute". The brumation of Gila monsters begins in October. Gila monsters can live up to 40 years in captivity, though rarely.

Little is known about the social behavior of Gila monster, but it has been observed engaging in male to male combat, in which the dominant male lies on top of the subordinate one and pins it with its front and hind limbs. While fighting, both lizards arch their bodies, pushing against each other and twisting around in an effort to gain the dominant position. A “wrestling match” ends when the pressure exerts their forces, although bouts may be repeated. These bouts are typically observed in the mating season. Males with greater strength and endurance are thought to enjoy greater reproductive success. Although the Gila monster has a low metabolism and one of the lowest lizard sprint speeds, it has one of the highest aerobic scope values (the increase in oxygen consumption from rest to maximum metabolic exertion) among lizards, allowing it to engage in intense aerobic activity for a sustained period of time.

Conservation status 
Gila monsters are listed as near threatened by the IUCN. They are listed as "Apparently Secure" by NatureServe.

In 1952, the Gila monster became the first venomous animal to be given legal protection. They are now protected in all states of their distribution. International trade in the species is regulated under Appendix II of CITES.

Relocation 
"Possibly the greatest threat to the continued existence of helodermatids is the man-made destruction of their habitat as the land is developed for construction or to create more cultivable land." Gila monsters found in these situations and relocated – with best intentions – up to   away, return to where they were found within 2 months and at great effort. This is up to five times the normal energy use than if they had not been removed, which uses up their energy stores unnecessarily. The same is true for animals relocated to appropriate habitats. Besides this, they also become more exposed to predators. Therefore, the process of simple relocation is "naïve" and potentially dangerous for both the relocated animals and existing populations and for the inhabitants of the region where the resettlement is taking place. If relocating the lizards further away, they might be totally disoriented, thus their survival is still very questionable. A more successful strategy would be, for example, if the new "settlers" were offered intensive education about this species (e.g., limited toxicity, lifestyle) with the aim of tolerating the reptile or even being proud of having this unique "roommate" in one's own neighborhood.

In 1963, the San Diego Zoo became the first zoo to successfully breed Gila monsters in captivity. In the last two decades, experienced breeders have shared their knowledge and expertise to give advice to other herpetologists on overcoming the difficulties in Heloderma reproduction under human care.

Relationship with humans 
Though the Gila monster is venomous, in having laggard movement, it poses little threat to humans. However, it has a fearsome reputation and is often killed by humans. Myths that have formed about the Gila monster include that the animal's breath is toxic enough to kill humans, that it can spit venom like a spitting cobra, that it can leap several feet in the air to attack, and that the Gila monster did not have an anus and therefore expelled waste from its mouth, the source of its venom and "fetid breath" (likely stemming from the fact that its venom in fact has an intense, specific smell). Among Native American tribes, the Gila monster had a mixed standing. The Apache believed its breath could kill a man, and the Tohono O'Odham and the Pima believed it possessed a spiritual power that could cause sickness. In contrast, the Seri and the Yaqui believed the Gila monster's hide had healing properties.

The Gila monster starred as a monster in the film The Giant Gila Monster (though the titular monster was actually portrayed by a Mexican beaded lizard). It played a minor role in the motion picture The Treasure of the Sierra Madre. In Brock Brower's 1971 novel The Late Great Creature, fictional horror movie star Simon Moro is presented as famous for playing the reptilian werewolf-like Gila Man. The 2011 animated film Rango featured a Gila monster as an Old West outlaw named Bad Bill, voiced by Ray Winstone.

The Gila monster has also seen usage as a mascot and state symbol. The official mascot of Eastern Arizona College located in Thatcher, Arizona, is Gila Hank, a gun-toting, cowboy hat-wearing Gila monster.  In 2017, the Vegas Golden Knights selected a Gila monster named Chance as their official mascot. In 2019, the state of Utah made the Gila monster its official state reptile.

Gallery

References

Further reading 
 
  Online .pdf
 
 
 
 
 
 
 Schwandt, Hans-Joachim (2019). heloderma.net The Gila Monster Heloderma suspectum, Edition Chimaira, Frankfurt/Main,

External links

Helodermatidae
Reptiles described in 1869
Venomous lizards
Fauna of the Sonoran Desert
Reptiles of Mexico
Reptiles of the United States
Fauna of the Southwestern United States
Articles containing video clips
Taxa named by Edward Drinker Cope
Symbols of Utah